Thomas Duffield  was a Master of University College, Oxford, England.
Duffield became Master of the College in 1396 and remained in the post until 1398.

References 

Year of birth missing
Year of death missing
14th-century English people
14th-century scholars
Masters of University College, Oxford